Back 2 Basics is the ninth album by Diljit Dosanjh music by Tru Skool released worldwide on 1 November 2012. It is his eighth pop album and first in three years. His last pop album, The Next Level, was followed up with the religious album SIKH.

Back to Basics has nine tracks in which music is by Tru Skool and is under the label Speed Records. Dosanjh went on tour in 2012 in support of the album.

Track listing

References 

2012 albums